The Rafidain List or Al Rafidain National List (or Mesopotamia List) is the name of the list that is used by Assyrian Democratic Movement during the Iraqi elections, headed by Yunadam Kanna.

At the 2005 parliamentary elections, the NRL got with 36,255 votes (0.4%) and one seat. The National Rafidain List was ahead in Australia and came in a close second in the US.

For the 2018 Iraqi parliamentary election, ADM decided to also include the Assyrian Patriotic Party in the list as well.

Sources

External links
Official website

Political parties of minorities in Iraq
Assyrian political parties
Assyrians in Iraq
Political parties in Kurdistan Region